Dennis Fountain Page (1 December 1919 – 19 January 2009) was the Anglican Bishop of Lancaster from 1975 until 1985.

Page was educated at Shrewsbury School and Gonville and Caius College, Cambridge. He was ordained in 1943 and was a curate at Rugby, Warwickshire before becoming the   priest in Charge of Hillmorton and then the Rector of  Hockwold. From 1965 to 1975 he was the Archdeacon of Huntingdon before his ordination to the episcopate by Stuart Blanch, Archbishop of York, at Blackburn Cathedral on 1 March 1975.

References

1919 births
2009 deaths
People educated at Shrewsbury School
Alumni of Gonville and Caius College, Cambridge
Archdeacons of Huntingdon
20th-century Church of England bishops
Anglican bishops of Lancaster